Philosophy of a Knife is a 2008 Russian-American horror film written, produced, shot, edited, and directed by . It covers the Japanese Army's Unit 731, mixing archival footage, interviews, and extremely graphic reenactments of experiments performed there.

The film is four hours long and is presented in two parts (Part one and Part two). It was shot in black and white and in English. The interviews are shot in color and have English subtitles.

Plot 
During World War II in Japan, a covert division known as Unit 731 conducts gruesome experiments on humans in its research for biological and chemical warfare.

Release
Philosophy of a Knife was shown at the 2008 Sitges Film Festival. TLA Releasing and Unearthed Films released the unrated film on DVD in July 2008.

Soundtrack
The film features Manoush and Cyanide Savior's song "Dead Before Born" as well as a song by A. Shevchenko, "Forgive Me", with Manoush speaking the introduction to the track. It also includes an original score by Shevchenko.
A selection of tracks named Choice Cuts from Philosophy of a Knife has been released as a limited edition double vinyl, plus a bonus CD by Spikerot Records in 2018.

Reception 

The Worldwide Celluloid Massacre has Philosophy of a Knife listed as the fifth most disturbing film it has covered, and stated that while it was interesting and intense "I was reminded of Gibson's Passion in that the movie takes an ambitious and difficult subject, then spends most of its time focusing only on gore".

Rob Hunter of the Film School Rejects called it a "crappy exploitation film" and "pseudo-documentary" that could only be worth watching "if all of Iskanov's footage was edited out, and just the documentary footage coupled with the dry, British, informative narration were left". A 0 out of 5 was given by Dread Central's Scott A. Johnson, who concluded, "As a reviewer, one tries to find a few positive things to say about each film. Congratulations are in order for Philosophy of a Knife in that it succeeded in being the crappiest pile of masturbatory, art-house wannabe, pedantic and mean-spirited shit I've ever had the displeasure of watching".

See also
 Men Behind the Sun

References

External links
 
 
 
 Review at 10kbullets.com

2008 films
2008 horror films
2008 multilingual films
2000s horror drama films
Russian horror drama films
American multilingual films
Russian multilingual films
American horror drama films
American splatter films
2000s Russian-language films
Russian black-and-white films
American black-and-white films
Films about war crimes
Films set in Japan
Films shot in Russia
American World War II films
Second Sino-Japanese War films
Japan in non-Japanese culture
2000s English-language films
2000s American films